Laine Courtney McDonald is an Australian politician. She was a Labor member of the Western Australian Legislative Council for North Metropolitan from 27 September 2016, when she was elected in a countback following the resignation of Ken Travers, to 21 May 2017, when her term concluded following her defeat at the 2017 state election.

She was educated at Kent Street Senior High School. Prior to her entry into parliament, McDonald was a City of Vincent councillor.

References

Year of birth missing (living people)
Living people
People educated at Kent Street Senior High School
Members of the Western Australian Legislative Council
Place of birth missing (living people)
Australian Labor Party members of the Parliament of Western Australia
Western Australian local councillors
21st-century Australian politicians
21st-century Australian women politicians
Women members of the Western Australian Legislative Council
Women local councillors in Australia